Oak Park is an urban neighborhood of the Southeast region of San Diego, California.

Geography
The neighborhood's borders are defined by Euclid Avenue to the west, Chollas Parkway/Streamview Drive/College Avenue to the north, and State Route 94 to the southeast.  Oak Park map

Demographics
Oak Park is a very diverse neighborhood and home to one of the higher concentrations of African-Americans in the city. Current demographics for the neighborhood are as follows: people of Hispanic/Latino heritage make up 31.2%, followed by Asians at 25.8%, then African-Americans at 22.0%, non-Hispanic Whites at 16.5%, Mixed Race at 3.7%, and others at 0.8%

Economy
Oak Park is located 4 miles (6 km) from San Diego State University. The community is home to a large mall, the Marketplace at the Grove Shopping Center, with anchor stores of Walmart, Target, Kohl's, Sam's Club and 24-Hour Fitness.

The center originally opened as a traditional shopping mall called College Grove with anchors of JC Penney, Walker Scott, Sears, and various national chain retail stores. It was the first shopping center in central San Diego for the burgeoning community growing in the area in the Post-War era.

Over the years, management changed hands and in the mid-80s briefly became The Grove and received a pastel-influenced makeover. By this time rent had increased sharply and one by one tenants left. Before the mall closed the center had only Mervyns, Longs Drugs, MANN Theaters, and a branch of the United States Post Office.

Close to the end of the 1990s, a master plan was created to revitalized the dead mall, with ambitious plans including the redevelopment of the mall into strip mall with many big box retailers. Walmart, Sam's Club, Pic 'N' Save (Later Big Lots), Party City, and HomeBase opened in March 2000. Mervyns and Longs Drugs were the only hold overs from the original mall.

In the next ten years HomeBase would become House2Home and eventually go bankrupt and be replaced by Target. Longs Drugs was acquired by CVS and closed. Mervyns went out of business in 2008 as a result of the late 2000s recession but by late 2009 was gutted and replaced by Kohl's. As of 2010, the shopping center sees daily full parking lots, a feat not even achieved by the mall in its prime.

Community character
Oak Park is characterized by single family homes, condominiums and apartments, as well as Navy housing. It is an established, stable community, demographically diverse and generally representative of San Diego.

Oak Park is divided between City Council District 4 and District 7. It has a fire station and a branch of the public library. It has a strong community organization, the Oak Park Community Council.

The jewel of Oak Park is  Chollas Lake, a  lake designated for free youth fishing (age 15 and under); a 0.8 mile dirt path around the lake for walking, jogging, and bicycling; picnic tables with barbecue grills; children's play equipment; a small basketball court; hiking trails; and a multi-purpose ball field in North Chollas canyon.

Education
Oak Park hosts two elementary schools.
 Oak Park Elementary School (San Diego Unified School District):Oak Park Elementary Music Conservatory Magnet School enrolls grades kindergarten through 5th grade. The registered enrollment was 823 students for the 2007–2008 school year.
 Carver Elementary School (San Diego Unified School District)

References

Neighborhoods in San Diego